Sango-sho Densetsu: Aoi Umi no Erufii (サンゴ礁伝説 青い海のエルフィ, Coral Reef Legend: Elfie of the Blue Sea) is a 1986 Japanese anime fantasy adventure television film directed by Yoshio Kuroda. It was broadcast on May 19, 1986, on Fuji Television.

Plot
In the future, the oceans have risen to flood all the continents due to humanity's negligence of the environment. Only a few bits of land have been spared, and one of those is the city-island where Elfie lives with her grandfather. One day, due to an underwater incident, she discovers that she can breathe underwater. Her grandfather reveals that in truth she is one of the mythical sea-people. Using the city folk's xenophobia, local politicians spark a war with these hidden people to distract people from their current resource problems, and Elfie is caught in the middle of it.

Releases
It was released in Portugal as Elfie a Salvadora do Planeta.

References

External links
 Elfie at Nippon Animation
 

1980s fantasy adventure films
1986 anime films
Adventure anime and manga
Animated adventure films
Anime television films
Fuji TV original programming
Japanese fantasy adventure films
Japanese animated fantasy films
Nippon Animation films
1986 films